Infinispan is a distributed cache and key-value NoSQL data store software developed by Red Hat. Java applications can embed it as library, use it as a service in WildFly or any non-java applications can use it as remote service through TCP/IP.

History 

Infinispan is the successor of JBoss Cache. The project was announced in 2009.

Features 

 Transactions
 MapReduce
 Support for LRU and LIRS eviction algorithms
 Through pluggable architecture, infinispan is able to persist data to filesystem, relational databases with JDBC, LevelDB, NoSQL databases like MongoDB, Apache Cassandra or HBase and others.

Usage
Typical use-cases for Infinispan include:

 Distributed cache, often in front of a database
 Storage for temporal data, like web sessions
 In-memory data processing and analytics
 Cross-JVM communication and shared storage
 MapReduce Implementation in the In-Memory Data Grid.

Infinispan is also used in academia and research as a framework for distributed execution and storage.
 Cloud2Sim leverages Infinispan for its distributed execution of MapReduce workflows and simulations.
 MEDIator data sharing synchronization platform for medical image archives leverages Infinispan as its distributed in-memory storage, as well as distributed execution framework.
 Cassowary uses Infinispan to store the context information in-memory, in order to provide the middleware platform for context-aware smart buildings.

See also 

 Ehcache
 Hazelcast
 Java Transaction API

References 

Cache (computing)
Free memory management software
Free software programmed in Java (programming language)
Cross-platform free software
Red Hat software